"Forever" is a 2001 pop song by German singer Sandra. It is a love ballad written by Peter Ries and Wolfgang Filz, and produced by Michael Cretu and Jens Gad. The song was released in October 2001 as the lead single from Sandra's seventh studio album The Wheel of Time and was a minor success on the official German chart. Music website AllMusic rated the song 3.5 out of 5 stars.

"Forever" was accompanied by a music video directed by Thomas Job, which was released on the 2003 DVD The Complete History.

Track listing
 CD maxi single
"Forever" (Radio Edit) – 3:45
"Forever" (Straight 4 U Radio Edit) – 3:31
"Forever" (Beatnik Club Mix) – 8:57
"Forever" (Straight 4 U Remix) – 5:43

Charts

References

External links
 "Forever" at Discogs
 The official Sandra YouTube channel

2001 singles
2001 songs
Sandra (singer) songs
Song recordings produced by Jens Gad
Song recordings produced by Michael Cretu
Virgin Records singles
Songs written by Peter Ries